SMS V25  was a  of the Imperial German Navy that served during the First World War. The ship was built by AG Vulcan at Stettin in Prussia (now Szczecin in Poland), and was completed in June 1914. The ship was sunk by a British mine on 13 February 1915.

Construction and design
In 1913, the Imperial German Navy placed orders for 12 high-seas torpedo boats, with six each ordered from AG Vulcan (V25–V30) and Schichau-Werke (S31–S36). While the designs built by each shipyard were broadly similar, they differed from each other in detail, and were significantly larger and more capable than the small torpedo boats built for the German Navy in the last two years.

V25 was launched from AG Vulcan's Stettin shipyard on 29 January 1914 and commissioned on 27 June 1914.

Armament consisted of three 8.8 cm SK L/45 naval guns in single mounts, together with six 50 cm (19.7 in) torpedo tubes with two fixed single tubes forward and 2 twin mounts aft. Up to 24 mines could be carried. The ship had a complement of 83 officers and men.

Service
The newly completed V25 was one of the few modern German torpedo boats in the Baltic suitable for offensive operations on the outbreak of the First World War and was deployed as part of the Baltic coast-defence division. On 7 September V25 took part in a sortie into the Gulf of Bothnia with the cruiser  which resulted in the sinking of a Russian steamer off Raumo. By October 1914 V25 was part of the 17th Half-flotilla of the High Seas Fleet.

The weather was extremely poor, with the torpedo-boats struggling in the heavy seas, and after V25 collided with sister ship  causing minor damage, the destroyers turned back, leaving the two cruisers to carry on unescorted. The minefield claimed a British trawler, Windsor, on 22 January.

On 12 February, five torpedo boats of the 9th Flotilla were deployed to screen minesweeping operations near the Amrum Bank in the North Sea. When V25 did not return from this operation, a search found wreckage north of Helgoland. At the time it was believed that she had been sunk by a British submarine, although in fact, no British submarines were in the vicinity, and V25 had probably been sunk by a British mine. All 79 of her crew were lost, including Korvettenkapitän Paul Jacobi, commanding officer of the 17 Half-flotilla, after whom the destroyer Paul Jacobi was named in the 1930s.

References

Bibliography

Torpedo boats of the Imperial German Navy
1914 ships
Ships built in Stettin
World War I torpedo boats of Germany
Ships lost with all hands
Ships sunk by mines
Maritime incidents in 1915
World War I shipwrecks in the North Sea